This is a recap of the 1970 season for the Professional Bowlers Association (PBA) Tour.  It was the tour's 12th season, and consisted of 35 events. Dave Soutar had the most titles on the 1970 Tour (5), but it was Nelson Burton, Jr., winner of four titles and the George Young High Average award, who claimed the Sporting News PBA Player of the Year award.

Mike McGrath successfully defended his 1969 title at the PBA National Championship. Don Johnson nearly made history in winning the Firestone Tournament of Champions, firing a 299 game in the finale to upend Dick Ritger, 299-268.

Dick Weber won the season-ending Hawaiian Invitational to become the first player to reach 20 career PBA Tour titles. This season also saw the debut of PBA legend Earl Anthony, a 31-year old rookie. Anthony would win the first of his 43 titles on June 7 at the Heidelberg Open.

Tournament schedule

References

External links
1970 Season Schedule

Professional Bowlers Association seasons
1970 in bowling